The 2006–07 Scottish Challenge Cup was the 16th season of the competition, competed for by all 30 members of the Scottish Football League.

Ross County and Clyde were the finalists, the final was played at McDiarmid Park, Perth and was won on penalties by Ross County.

Schedule

First round

North and East region 
Alloa Athletic received a random bye into the second round.

Source: ESPN Soccernet

South and West region 
Clyde received a random bye into the second round.

Source: ESPN Soccernet

Second round

Source: ESPN Soccernet

Quarter-finals

Semi-finals

Final

Top scorers

4 goals
 Scott Chaplain – Albion Rovers

3 goals
 Craig Gunn – Ross County
 Kevin McKinlay – Ross County
 Paul McGowan – Greenock Morton

References

External links 
 BBC Scottish Cups page
 Scottish Football League Challenge Cup page

Scottish Challenge Cup seasons
Challenge Cup